Parque O'Higgins is a metro station on the Line 2 of the Santiago Metro, in Santiago, Chile. It is located in the middle of the east branch of the Autopista Central, on a raised embankment, just prior to an elevated viaduct that crosses Matta avenue. The station is named for the adjacent Parque O'Higgins, located west of the station.

The station was opened on 31 March 1978 as part of the inaugural section of the line, between Los Héroes and Franklin.

References

Santiago Metro stations
Railway stations opened in 1978
Santiago Metro Line 2